Two Hearts (Italian: Due cuori) is a 1943 Italian romance film directed by Carlo Borghesio and starring Erzsi Simor, Károly Kovács and Osvaldo Genazzani.

It was shot at the Fert Studios in Turin. The film's sets were designed by the art director Guglielmo Borzone.

Cast
 Erzsi Simor as Anna Serrati 
 Károly Kovács as Andrea Dalmonte 
 Osvaldo Genazzani as Gianni Serrati 
 Nino Crisman as Ruggero Berti, il fidanzato di Anna 
 Guglielmo Sinaz as De Marchis 
 Olga Vittoria Gentilli as Zia Gertrude 
 Ela Franceschetti as La cameriera 
 Ernesto Conte as L'avvocato 
 Domenico Grossetto
 Tania Lante
 Diana Mauri
 Tina Santi
 Felice Minotti

References

Bibliography 
 Poppi, Roberto. I registi: dal 1930 ai giorni nostri. Gremese Editore, 2002.

External links 
 
 Two Hearts at Variety Distribution

1943 films
Italian romance films
1940s romance films
1940s Italian-language films
Films directed by Carlo Borghesio
Italian black-and-white films
1940s Italian films